Rhodoprasina viksinjaevi is a species of moth of the family Sphingidae. It is known from Guangdong and Hunan in China.

The wingspan is 82–100 mm. It is similar to Rhodoprasina corrigenda but smaller and with a bluish tint to the greenish forewings. The pink basal area on the hindwing extends to the centre of the wing

References

Rhodoprasina
Moths described in 2004